Northwood is a neighborhood in the northeastern section of Baltimore, Maryland in the United States. Northwood is served by the New Northwood and the Original Northwood community associations. The area is also home to the Northwood Shopping Center and the Northwood Baseball League. Morgan State University is located in this area.

The proposed Green Line Subway extension would include a station in this neighborhood, as well as a station at Morgan State University.

New Northwood
 
As the name implies, New Northwood is composed of newer homes, built in the mid 1950s. The houses are generally brick row house with trees and shrubs lining most blocks. New Northwood is served by the New Northwood Covenant Association.

Demographics
According to the 2000 US Census, 7,000 people live in New Northwood with 96.2% African-American and 2.4% White. The median household income is $31,105 and 94.1% of the houses are occupied.

Original Northwood

Original Northwood is composed of single family and townhouses ranging in price from $175,000 to $500,000. Development began in September 1930 with themes such as half-timbering and stucco, irregular massing, and the New England house form with jetty. Development began when The Roland Park Company purchased the estates of John W. Garrett, Enoch Pratt and Arunah Shepherdson Abell. By January 1, 1932, about 25 families had bought homes in Original Northwood. Today, Original Northwood comprises 369 homes and is one of the top 15 city neighborhoods in wealth. Original Northwood was designated an Historic District in 1998 and represents the largest unified collection of the architect, John A. Ahlers. Ahlers planning for the inclusion of the natural terrain in his design, with a canopy of oaks and elms, made Original Northwood among the first totally planned communities in the nation.

Northwood Historic District was listed on the National Register of Historic Places in 1998.

Demographics
According to the 2000 US Census, 1,240 people live in Original Northwood with 56.5% African-American and 37.9% White. The median household income is $64,688 and 93.5% of the houses are occupied.

Notable residents
Patricia Jessamy- State's Attorney, Baltimore City
Robert W. Curran- member, Baltimore City Council
Tom Marr - Baltimore radio broadcaster for WCBM and WFBR, and former play-by-play announcer for the Baltimore Orioles
Tom Clancy- author

Legislative districts

References

External links
, including photo from 1996, at Maryland Historical Trust, and accompanying map

African-American history in Baltimore
Historic districts on the National Register of Historic Places in Baltimore
Northwood
Northeast Baltimore